Brind is a surname. Notable people with the surname include:

 Alan Brind, British violinist
 Bridget Brind, British diplomat
 Bryony Brind (1960–2015), British ballerina
 Joel Brind, American biologist and endocrinologist
 John Brind (1878–1954), British Army officer
 Patrick Brind (1892–1963), British Royal Navy officer
 Richard Brind (died 1718), English organist
 Stephanie Brind (born 1977), English squash player
 William Darby Brind (1794–1850), New Zealand mariner

See also 

 Brind, hamlet in England